The CBS News Weekend Roundup is a weekly news show that airs on CBS News Radio, designed for a one-hour time slot, though it has an actual length without commercials of about forty minutes. It reviews the previous week's news and provides insights on possible future developments in the United States and the world.

The show, produced Friday afternoons, also airs on CBS News Radio affiliates on Saturdays and Sundays. It includes interviews with CBS News radio and TV correspondents and various newsmakers, compilations of reports through the week that have aired both on CBS-TV and CBS News Radio, as well as commentary from actor and TV personality Charles Grodin.

In addition, an ad-free podcast of the entire program has been available from CBS News since early 2006, which is first distributed Friday afternoon.

During breaking news events on Fridays and Saturdays the program is updated to affiliate stations which have not aired the program yet to provide the updated information, and likewise the podcast feed.

The Weekend Roundup is anchored by the correspondent Allison Keyes in the CBS News Washington, D.C. bureau. Skyview Networks handles the distribution.

The broadcast has aired weekly on the network since 2000. The network's then-news director, Mike Freedman, was the creator and first executive producer of the show, with Charlie Kaye as producer. Bill Lynch, former anchor of the CBS World News Roundup morning edition, was the first host of the Weekend Roundup, then based in New York.

Dan Raviv had a long tenure as anchor of the broadcast, with Washington DC Bureau Chief Howard Arenstein serving as the executive producer and substitute anchor. Arenstein left CBS in late 2016 and Raviv quietly departed a few weeks later. Washington Executive Editor Steve Dorsey anchored for a few years until being replaced by Allison Keyes in 2019.

The CBS News Weekend Roundup is based on the early CBS Radio format of reporters discussing the issues from different points of the world or nation. That 1938 format was not only the basis for the CBS World News Roundup, which airs mornings and evenings on the radio network, but the Sunday morning talk shows that are a staple of American TV.
 
The Weekend Roundup is also a direct successor to the CBS Radio Network show Capital Ideas, focusing on government and domestic news, which aired during the 1990s from Washington, D.C. and featured correspondents Rob Armstrong and John Hartge as well as Arenstein.

References

External links
CBS News Weekend Roundup podcasting feed (XML)
CBS News Weekend Roundup on the iTunes Store
Dan Raviv's Twitter profile
CBS News
2000 radio programme debuts
2006 podcast debuts